Kırıkdağ is a village in the central district of Hakkâri Province in Turkey. The village is populated by Kurds of the Jirkî tribe and had a population of 1,254 in 2022.

The hamlets of Dikmen, Gümüşlü, Kırbaş, Su and Yüce are attached to Kırıkdağ.

Population 
Population history from 2000 to 2022:

References 

Villages in Hakkâri District
Kurdish settlements in Hakkâri Province